Attorney General McCarter may refer to:

Robert H. McCarter (1859–1941), Attorney General of New Jersey
Thomas N. McCarter (1867–1955), Attorney General of New Jersey

See also
Attorney General Carter (disambiguation)